Expurse of Sodomy is an EP released by German thrash metal band Sodom. Some copies were released on picture disc and limited edition in clear vinyl. The song "Sodomy & Lust" has been covered by Cradle of Filth, Exhumed, and Epilepsia.

Track listing

Personnel
Tom Angelripper – bass, vocals
Frank Blackfire – guitar
Chris Witchhunter– drums

References

External links
Sodom's official website

1987 EPs
Sodom (band) EPs
Black metal EPs
Albums produced by Harris Johns